Seni Gambat railway station is  located in Gambat, Pakistan.

See also
 List of railway stations in Pakistan
 Pakistan Railways

References

External links

Railway stations in Kohat District
Railway stations on Khushalgarh–Kohat–Thal Railway